Podstudenec is a small settlement on Black Creek, a tributary of the Kamnik Bistrica River, in the Municipality of Kamnik in the Upper Carniola region of Slovenia.

References

External links

Podstudenec on Geopedia

Populated places in the Municipality of Kamnik